The 1987 National Soccer League season was the sixty-fourth season under the National Soccer League (NSL) name. The season began in early May 1987 and concluded in early October 1987 with the NSL Championship final where Toronto Italia defeated London Marconi. Toronto would secure a league treble by winning the NSL Ontario Cup against Windsor Wheels and claiming the NSL Canada Cup from St. Léonard-Corfinium of the Quebec National Soccer League (LNSQ). On the other hand, Windsor became the regular season champions by finishing first in the standings. As a result, Windsor would travel to Montreal, Quebec to face the LNSQ league champions Sherbrooke Univestrie, and would win the NSL Canadian Championship.

Overview 
The 1987 season marked another major change in the Canadian soccer landscape as the Canadian Soccer Association's (CSA) nationally sanctioned Canadian Soccer League (CSL) made its debut with a consequential effect on the National Soccer League (NSL). The formation of the CSL caused tension between both leagues and the national governing body. The original cause of divisiveness was based on the CSA's policy of no ethnic affiliated teams, which caused several rejections of noted NSL clubs in acquiring a franchise in the CSL. In response, the Ontario-centered NSL began competing with the nascent national league by utilizing their affiliated agreements with the Pacific Rim Soccer League of British Columbia and the Quebec National Soccer League (LNSQ) for national recognition. The agreements were based on an alternative method to the CSL's method of employing an interlocking national schedule. The NSL's approach was in regards to travel expenses being reduced by providing a regionalized format where regionalized leagues with separate schedules would provide contenders to a postseason tournament, which determined the national champion.

Before the commencement of both CSL and NSL seasons, various negotiations took place with proposals to integrate or establish a promotion and relegation system within both leagues and a reasonable compromise to the ethnically supported clubs. The discussions failed to produce any results and both leagues continued working in opposition to one another with different philosophical approaches to a national league system. Internally several changes were approved at the NSL annual general meeting with plans of reestablishing a reserve division, and intentions of creating a promotion and relegation system within the league. League commissioner Rocco Lofranco continued negotiating with various organizations in hopes of establishing further affiliated agreements in the Maritimes and the Canadian Prairies.

The membership in the league increased to eleven members with all clubs returning except the Toronto Blizzard defecting to the CSL. The new entries were centered in Toronto which included Chile Lindo, Nacional Latino, Toronto International, and the Mississauga Lakers of the Petro Canada League receiving an NSL franchise.

Teams

Coaching changes

Final standings

Cup  
The cup tournament was a separate contest from the rest of the season, in which all eleven teams took part. All the matches were separate from the regular season, and the teams were grouped into two separate divisions. The two winners in the group stage would advance to a singles match for the Cup. The winner of the league cup would face the Quebec National Soccer League (LNSQ) cup titleholder for the NSL Canada Cup.

Finals

NSL Canadian Championship 
Since the 1986 season, a joint effort was conducted between the Pacific Rim Soccer League of British Columbia, National Soccer League, and the Quebec National Soccer League to provide a national champion. Their regional champions would face each other in a singles match for the championship. The Pacific Rim Soccer League participated in the first tournament but ceased operations in 1987. While their league cup champions would compete for the NSL Canada Cup.

NSL Canadian Championship

NSL Canada Cup

References

External links
RSSSF CNSL page
thecnsl.com - 1987 season

1987–88 domestic association football leagues
National Soccer League
1987